The Nokia 1011 (NHE-2X5, NHE-2XN) is the first mass-produced GSM phone. It was sold also as Mobira Cityman 2000. The typenumber refers to the launch date, 10 November 1992.

The black handset measured 195 x 60 x 45 mm and featured a monochrome LCD and an extendable antenna. The memory could hold 99 phone numbers. It did not yet employ Nokia's characteristic ringtone: that was only introduced in 1994. The phone operated in the 900 MHz GSM band. At that time the device cost about 2500 DM (about  euros today).

The phone was able to send and receive SMS messages, even if Nokia says that its model 2110 phone was the first SMS-enabled GSM phone.

Nokia 1011 continued production until 1994, when Nokia 2010 and Nokia 2110 were introduced as successors.

References

Nokia phones 1000 series
1011
Mobile phones introduced in 1993